The 2003–04 UEFA Cup was won by Valencia in the final against Marseille. It wrapped up a league and UEFA Cup double for Valencia.

Porto could not defend their title as they automatically qualified for the 2003–04 UEFA Champions League and also went on to win the final for their second European Cup title.

Association ranking
For the 2003–04 UEFA Cup, the associations were allocated places according to their 2002 UEFA country coefficients, which took into account their performance in European competitions from 1997–98 to 2001–02.

Teams
The labels in the parentheses show how each team qualified for the place of its starting round:
 TH: Title holders
 CW: Cup winners
 CR: Cup runners-up
 LC: League Cup winners
 Nth: League position
 PO: End-of-season European competition play-offs (winners or position)
 IC: Intertoto Cup
 FP: Fair play
 CL: Relegated from the Champions League
 GS: Third-placed teams from the group stage
 Q3: Losers from the third qualifying round

Notes

Qualifying round

|}

First leg

Second leg

Viktoria Žižkov won 6–1 on aggregate.

Groclin won 6–1 on aggregate.

Matador Púchov won 6–1 on aggregate.

Nordsjælland won 6–0 on aggregate.

Hapoel Tel Aviv won 3–2 on aggregate.

Sartid won 4–1 on aggregate.

Publikum won 12–2 on aggregate.

Dnipro Dnipropetrovsk won 2–0 on aggregate.

Artmedia Petržalka won 2–0 on aggregate.

Dinamo București won 6–3 on aggregate.

Red Star Belgrade won 8–2 on aggregate.

Lens won 5–0 on aggregate.

Odense won 4–1 on aggregate.

Varteks won 6–3 on aggregate.

3–3 on aggregate. Ventspils won on away goals.

Levski Sofia won 6–1 on aggregate.

Maccabi Haifa won 6–0 on aggregate.

Željezničar won 4–1 on aggregate.

Debrecen won 3–2 on aggregate.

Lyn won 9–1 on aggregate.

Zimbru Chişinău won 2–0 on aggregate.

Esbjerg won 9–1 on aggregate.

Kärnten won 3–2 on aggregate.

Malmö won 6–0 on aggregate.

1–1 on aggregate. Steaua București won on away goals.

MyPa won 5–4 on aggregate.

Brøndby won 5–0 on aggregate.

Ferencváros won 6–0 on aggregate

AIK won 1–0 on aggregate.

Kamen Ingrad won 9–1 on aggregate

Molde won 6–0 on aggregate

2–2 on aggregate. Hajduk Split won on away goals.

Neuchâtel Xamax won 4–0 on aggregate.

APOEL won 5–1 on aggregate.

Torpedo Moscow won 9–0 on aggregate.

Dundee won 6–0 on aggregate.

Lokeren won 7–1 on aggregate.

Olimpija Ljubljana won 4–2 on aggregate

Manchester City won 7–0 on aggregate.

1–1 on aggregate. Cementarnica 55 won on away goals.

União de Leiria won 6–2 on aggregate.

First round

|}

First leg

Second leg

2–2 on aggregate. Torpedo Moscow won 3–2 on penalty shootout.

Gaziantepspor won 1–0 on aggregate.

Groclin won 1–0 on aggregate.

1–1 on aggregate. Hajduk Split won on away goals.

Levski Sofia won 5–0 on aggregate.

Debrecen won 6–3 on aggregate.

Spartak Moscow won 3–1 on aggregate.

1–1 on aggregate. Vålerenga won on away goals.

Panionios won 3–1 on aggregate.

Slavia Prague won 4–2 on aggregate.

Roma won 5–1 on aggregate.

Utrecht won 6–0 on aggregate.

Rosenborg won 10–1 on aggregate.

Bordeaux won 3–2 on aggregate.

Steaua București won 2–1 on aggregate.

PAOK won 3–1 on aggregate.

Dnipro Dnipropetrovsk won 4–2 on aggregate.

Molde won 3–2 on aggregate.

Maccabi Haifa won 4–3 on aggregate.

Dinamo București won 5–2 on aggregate.

Villarreal won 3–2 on aggregate.

Sochaux won 3–0 on aggregate.

Basel won 3–2 on aggregate.

2–2 on aggregate. Copenhagen won 3–2 on penalty shootout.

Sporting CP won 3–0 on aggregate.

Dinamo Zagreb won 3–1 on aggregate.

Newcastle United won 6–0 on aggregate.

Hearts won 2–0 on aggregate.

Auxerre won 2–0 on aggregate.

Red Star Belgrade won 6–5 on aggregate.

Aris won 3–2 on aggregate.

Borussia Dortmund won 3–1 on aggregate.

Manchester City won 4–2 on aggregate.

Wisła Kraków won 4–2 on aggregate.

Perugia won 3–1 on aggregate.

Parma won 4–1 on aggregate.

2–2 on aggregate. Austria Salzburg won on away goals.

Liverpool won 4–1 on aggregate.

Mallorca won 6–3 on aggregate.

Gençlerbirligi won 4–2 on aggregate.

Barcelona won 9–1 on aggregate.

Valencia won 2–0 on aggregate.

Benfica won 2–1 on aggregate.

Brøndby won 2–0 on aggregate.

Teplice won 3–1 on aggregate.

Feyenoord won 3–1 on aggregate.

Schalke 04 won 1–0 on aggregate.

Second round

|}

First leg

Second leg

2–2 on aggregate. Levski Sofia won on away goals.

1–1 on aggregate. Groclin won on away goals.

Dnipro Dnipropetrovsk won 3–1 on aggregate.

1–1 on aggregate. Debrecen won on away goals.

Villarreal won 2–1 on aggregate.

Teplice won 2–1 on aggregate.

Parma won 9–0 on aggregate.

3–3 on aggregate. Brøndby won 3–1 on penalty shootout.

Gaziantepspor won 6–1 on aggregate.

Rosenborg won 1–0 on aggregate.

Spartak Moscow won 5–3 on aggregate.

Perugia won 3–1 on aggregate.

Benfica won 5–1 on aggregate.

0–0 on aggregate. Vålerenga won 4–3 on penalty shootout.

Sochaux won 6–2 on aggregate.

Auxerre won 4–0 on aggregate.

Newcastle United won 4–2 on aggregate.

Roma won 2–1 on aggregate.

Bordeaux won 2–1 on aggregate.

Liverpool won 2–1 on aggregate.

Mallorca won 3–2 on aggregate.

Barcelona won 5–0 on aggregate.

Gençlerbirliği won 4–1 on aggregate.

Valencia won 4–0 on aggregate.

Third round

|}

First leg

Second leg

Gençlerbirliği won 4–0 on aggregate.

Marseille won 1–0 on aggregate.

Roma won 2–1 on aggregate.

Celtic won 3–1 on aggregate.

Bordeaux won 6–2 on aggregate.

Club Brugge won 1–0 on aggregate.

Valencia won 5–2 on aggregate.

Liverpool won 6–2 on aggregate.

PSV Eindhoven won 3–1 on aggregate.

Auxerre won 1–0 on aggregate.

2–2 on aggregate. Benfica won on away goals.

2–2 on aggregate. Internazionale won on away goals.

Newcastle United won 4-2 on aggregate.

Mallorca won 3–1 on aggregate.

Barcelona won 3–1 on aggregate.

Villarreal won 5–2 on aggregate.

Fourth round

|}

First leg

Second leg

Bordeaux won 4–1 on aggregate.

PSV Eindhoven won 4–1 on aggregate.

Villarreal won 3–2 on aggregate.

Celtic won 1–0 on aggregate.

Newcastle United won 7–1 on aggregate.

Internazionale won 4–3 on aggregate.

Marseille won 3–2 on aggregate.

Valencia won 2–1 on aggregate.

Quarter-finals
The first legs were played on 8 April, and the second legs were played on 14 April 2004.

|}

First leg

Second leg

Villarreal won 3–1 on aggregate.

Marseille won 2–0 on aggregate.

Newcastle United won 3–2 on aggregate.

Valencia won 4–2 on aggregate.

Semi-finals
The first legs were played on 22 April, and the second legs were played on 6 May 2004.

|}

First leg

Second leg

Marseille won 2–0 on aggregate.

Valencia won 1–0 on aggregate.

Final

Top goalscorers

See also
2003–04 UEFA Champions League
2003 UEFA Intertoto Cup

References

External links
2003–04 All matches UEFA Cup – season at UEFA website
Results at RSSSF.com
Details at guardian.co.uk
 All scorers 2003–04 UEFA Cup according to (excluding preliminary round) according to protocols UEFA + all scorers preliminary round
2003/04 UEFA Cup – results and line-ups (archive)
Regulations of UEFA Cup 2003-04

 
2003–04 in European football
UEFA Cup seasons